Calophyllum cuneifolium is a species of flowering plant in the Calophyllaceae family. It is found only in Sri Lanka.

References

Endemic flora of Sri Lanka
Critically endangered plants
cuneifolium
Taxonomy articles created by Polbot